The Macmillan aryballos is a Protocorinthian pottery aryballos in the collection of the British Museum.  Dating to about 640 BC, it is 6.9 cm high and 3.9 cm in diameter, and weighs 65 grams.

The vase is attributed to the Chigi Painter.  Its provenance is uncertain: Cecil Smith reported that it was acquired by Malcolm Macmillan at Thebes, and suggests that it was originally found in a tomb outside the town; but the British Museum Register records it as having been acquired by Macmillan in Corinth.  It was gifted to the British Museum by Macmillan in 1889.

The vase is made out of a yellow coloured clay, and painted in shades of brown and purple.  Fine details are incised into the clay. The upper part of the vase is in the shape of a lion's head, which appears to have been modelled rather than cast from a mould.

The vase is painted with a floral chain at the shoulder, three bands of figurative decorations, and rays at the base.  The top band is 2 cm high, and painted with a scene of eighteen warriors engaged in combat.  Unlike on the Chigi vase, another work by the same artist, where two phalanxes are depicted, the Macmillan aryballos shows hoplites engaged in single combat.  It stretches all the way around the aryballos, and has no clear beginning or end.  Each warrior wears a crested helmet and greaves, carries a round shield (each of which is decorated with a different device), and is armed with one or two spears.  The army coming from the right-hand side is depicted as victorious; the soldiers coming from the left are defeated.

The second band is 1 cm high and depicts a horse race, with six horses galloping from right to left.  Beneath one of these horses there is a swan and a crouching figure, possibly an ape.  The third band is 4 mm high and is decorated with a hunting scene, in which a hunter and hounds chase a hare and a fox or jackal.

Notes

References

Works cited
 
 
 
 
 
 

7th-century BC works
Ancient Greek and Roman objects in the British Museum
Individual ancient Greek vases